Takht-e Giveh Deran (also Romanized as Takht-e Gīveh Derān) is a village in Shalal and Dasht-e Gol Rural District, in the Central District of Andika County, Khuzestan Province, Iran. At the 2006 census, its population was 123, in 21 families.

References 

Populated places in Andika County